Chilocardamum is a small genus of four herbaceous cress-like species of plants in the family Brassicaceae, only found growing in Patagonia, southern Argentina.

Taxonomy
It was first described in 1924 by the German botanist Otto Eugen Schulz. The first known species, Ch. patagonicum, was initially classified as a Sisymbrium by Carlo Luigi Spegazzini in 1897. The other three species were more recently moved to this genus from Sisymbrium by the Iraqi botanist Ihsan Ali Al-Shehbaz, when he resurrected the genus in 2006. Dimitria was a monotypic genus created by the Chilean botanist Pierfelice Ravenna to house Ch. onuridifolium in 1972; now considered a synonym of the genus Chilocardamum, it was already synonymised with Sisymbrium by the Argentine botanist M. C. Romanczuk in 1981.

Description
Chilocardamum is quite similar in fruit and flower to Zuloagocardamum and Weberbauera. It is distinguished by having trichomes which are branched and dendritic, rarely with a few simple trichomes in the indumentum, the basal leaves are sessile and linear or awl-shaped, the stems are elongated and have cauline leaves, the inflorescence is an ebracteate raceme which is longer than the basal leaves, and seeds without mucilage. The fruit are non-curved, linear siliques which are not torulose.

Distribution
The genus is endemic to southern Argentina.

Species
As of 2017, the four species accepted in the Plants of the World Online database, and in the Flora del Conosur, are:

Chilocardamum castellanosii (O.E.Schulz) Al-Shehbaz
Chilocardamum longistylum (Romanczuk) Al-Shehbaz
Chilocardamum onuridifolium (Ravenna) Al-Shehbaz
Chilocardamum patagonicum (Speg.) O.E.Schulz

References

Brassicaceae
Plants described in 1924
Brassicaceae genera